The FBI's Ten Most Wanted Fugitives during the 1990s is a list, maintained for a fifth decade, of the Ten Most Wanted Fugitives of the United States Federal Bureau of Investigation.

FBI headlines in the 1990s
As a decade, the 1990s list stands out above others for its inclusion of a large number of highly notorious suspects, including several major terrorists, foreign and domestic. In 1993 and 1994, the FBI was scrutinized for its role in the Ruby Ridge and Waco incidents. In 1999, the most notorious suspect ever in American history, Osama bin Laden, was added to the list for the 1998 embassy attacks.

Although many 1990s terrorists have appeared on the top 10 list of fugitives, it was not until the aftermath of 9/11 in 2001 that the FBI began maintaining a separate list of Most Wanted Terrorists.

FBI 10 Most Wanted Fugitives to begin the 1990s
The FBI in the past has identified individuals by the sequence number in which each individual has appeared on the list. Some individuals have even appeared twice, and often a sequence number was permanently assigned to an individual suspect who was soon caught, captured, or simply removed, before his or her appearance could be published on the publicly released list. In those cases, the public would see only gaps in the number sequence reported by the FBI. For convenient reference, the wanted suspect's sequence number and date of entry on the FBI list appear below, whenever possible.

The following fugitives made up the top Ten list to begin the 1990s:

One spot on the list of ten remained unfilled from a capture late in the year 1989.  It was filled in the first month of the last year of the decade in 1990.

FBI Most Wanted Fugitives added during the 1990s
The list of the most wanted fugitives listed during the 1990s fluctuated throughout the decade with some fugitives making reappearances on the list. In 1992, there were no additions made by the FBI to the list, for the second time in its history. As before, spots on the list were occupied by fugitives who had been listed in prior years, and still remained at large. The list includes (in FBI list appearance sequence order):

1990–1999

End of the decade
As the decade closed, the following were still at large as the Ten Most Wanted Fugitives:

FBI directors in the 1990s
William S. Sessions (1987–1993)
Floyd I. Clarke (1993)
Louis J. Freeh (1993–2001)

References

External links
Current FBI Top Ten Most Wanted Fugitives

1990s in the United States